Hervey Rhodes, Baron Rhodes,  (12 August 1895 – 11 September 1987) was a British Labour Party politician.

Born in Saddleworth in the West Riding of Yorkshire, Rhodes was educated at St Mary's School, Greenfield and Huddersfield Technical College. He was employed within the woollen industry.

During the First World War he served with the King's Own Royal Lancashire Regiment, and later with the Yorkshire Regiment. Seconded to the Royal Flying Corps, Rhodes served as an observer/gunner with No. 12 Squadron flying the RE 8. The squadron was mainly engaged on reconnaissance and artillery spotting duties, but Rhodes and his usual pilot South African Lt Croye Pithey, claimed as a crew a total of five enemy aircraft destroyed and a five more claimed 'out of control'. Rhodes won the Distinguished Flying Cross and Bar. He was badly wounded in September 1918, and walked with a limp for the rest of his life. He left with the rank of Lieutenant-Colonel.

During the Second World War, Rhodes, by then a mill-owner and Chairman of the Saddleworth Urban District Council, became the commanding officer of his nearby Local Defence Volunteers (LDV), formed in 1940 to defend Britain against the armies of the Third Reich, then in occupation of much of Northern Europe and having succeeded in expelling the British Expeditionary Force from Europe at Dunkirk.

Initially, the LDV were issued only with an armband and brought along to parades and training such implements or weapons as they could improvise. Quite soon the LDV was jokingly said to stand for "Look, Duck & Vanish". The name was quickly changed to the Home Guard and within a few weeks was equipped with rifles, army pattern khaki uniform and had officers and NCOs appointed. Hervey Rhodes became the CO of the 36th (West Riding) Battalion, Duke of Wellington's Regiment. Major Rhodes (soon Lieutenant Colonel) visited the various companies, limping, complete with stick and pipe. The battalion was soon equipped with Thompson sub-machine guns and later, Sten guns and other weaponry. Rhodes served as CO of the battalion until it was disbanded. He then developed his political career, alongside his business interests at his mill in Delph.

In the 1945 general election, Rhodes stood without success as the Labour candidate in Royton, Lancashire. A few months later he was elected as Member of Parliament for Ashton-under-Lyne in a by-election on 1 October created by William Jowitt's elevation to the peerage.

Rhodes was parliamentary private secretary to Hilary Marquand, as Paymaster-General and Minister of Pensions. In 1950, he was promoted to Parliamentary Secretary to the Board of Trade, serving until Labour's defeat at the 1951 general election.

He served as MP until the 1964 general election, when he was succeeded by Robert Sheldon. He was created a life peer on 14 September 1964 as Baron Rhodes, of Saddleworth in the West Riding of the County of York. He again held office as Parliamentary Secretary to the Board of Trade from 1964 until 1967. He served as Lord Lieutenant of Lancashire from 1968. He was made a Privy Counsellor in 1969, a Knight of the Garter in 1972 and served as Deputy-Lord Lieutenant of Greater Manchester from 1974. He died in Oldham aged 92.

See also 
 Ashton-under-Lyne (UK Parliament constituency)
 Ashton-under-Lyne by-election, 1945

References

External links 
 

1895 births
1987 deaths
British Home Guard officers
Deputy Lieutenants of Greater Manchester
Knights of the Garter
Labour Party (UK) life peers
Labour Party (UK) MPs for English constituencies
Lord-Lieutenants of Lancashire
Members of the Privy Council of the United Kingdom
People from Saddleworth
Recipients of the Distinguished Flying Cross (United Kingdom)
Royal Flying Corps officers
UK MPs 1945–1950
UK MPs 1950–1951
UK MPs 1951–1955
UK MPs 1955–1959
UK MPs 1959–1964
UK MPs who were granted peerages
Parliamentary Secretaries to the Board of Trade
Royal Air Force officers
Royal Air Force personnel of World War I
British Army personnel of World War I
Members of the Parliament of the United Kingdom for Ashton-under-Lyne
Politicians awarded knighthoods
Ministers in the Attlee governments, 1945–1951
Ministers in the Wilson governments, 1964–1970
Life peers created by Elizabeth II
Green Howards soldiers
King's Own Royal Regiment soldiers
Military personnel from Yorkshire